Silverdale is a civil parish in the Borough of Newcastle-under-Lyme, Staffordshire, England. It contains only one designated listed building, the parish church of St Luke.

Parish church of St Luke

The church was built in 1853, by R. Armstrong, in the decorated style of Gothic Revival architecture, and is Grade II listed: this is defined as "Buildings of national importance and special interest".

References

Lists of listed buildings in Staffordshire
Borough of Newcastle-under-Lyme